Warren Leslie (May 3, 1927 – July 6, 2011) was an American author, journalist, and business executive.

Early life and career

Born in Manhattan, he served in the United States Marines during World War II and was educated at Yale University. He began his career as a reporter for The Dallas Morning News. He then became an executive at Neiman Marcus where he ultimately became vice president and chief spokesman for the company. He also worked as an executive for Revlon and operated his own public relations firm in New York City. He was married 4 times to 3 women, twice to Bonnie Titley Leslie, was then widowed by Revlon executive Kay Daly, née Kay Bradford. He was married to Carol Corbett-Leslie until his death in 2011.

Works
While working for Neiman Marcus, Leslie published Dallas Public and Private: Aspects of an American City in April 1964. The controversial work profiled the city of Dallas in light of the assassination of John F. Kennedy just four months after the tragic event, and was highly critical of the conservative political culture of Dallas.

Leslie published the novels The Best Thing That Ever Happened (1952) and The Starrs of Texas (1978).  He also co-authored scripts for the soap opera The Secret Storm with his sister, the actress and writer Bethel Leslie.

Death
He died in Chicago in 2011 at the age of 84. He was survived by one son, two grandchildren, and a great-grandson.

References

1927 births
2011 deaths
American male writers
The Dallas Morning News people
Yale University alumni
American journalists